Championship unification is the act of combining two or more separate professional wrestling championships into a single title.

History 
In professional wrestling, championships may be unified to consolidate the number of championships in a given promotion, or to add legitimacy and prestige to a certain title's lineage. In a title-for-title match, one of three things will happen:
 One of the championships is dropped
 A brand new championship is created
 Both championships remain active and are defended and lost together under one name, but title changes reflect each individual title's history

Notable events 
 The first two prominent unifications of titles in the United States were done by Nikita Koloff. In 1986, he unified the NWA National Heavyweight Championship into his NWA United States Heavyweight Championship by defeating Wahoo McDaniel, and in 1987 he unified the (Mid-South) UWF Television Championship into his NWA World Television Championship by defeating Terry Taylor. In both cases, the unification process was started by Nikita's home promotion, Jim Crockett Promotions, upon absorbing another promotion (Georgia Championship Wrestling and the Mid-South UWF, respectively), and in both cases the titles from the absorbed promotions were abandoned.
 The Triple Crown Heavyweight Championship was created with the unification of the NWA International Heavyweight Championship, the PWF World Heavyweight Championship, and the NWA United National Championship, when the NWA International Heavyweight Champion Jumbo Tsuruta defeated the PWF World Heavyweight and NWA United National Champion Stan Hansen on April 18, 1989.
 The Omaha World Heavyweight Championship  (a championship belt created by promoters in Omaha, Nebraska) unified with the AWA World Heavyweight Championship when  the titles was unified on September 7, 1963, when AWA World Heavyweight Champion Verne Gagne defeated Omaha World Heavyweight Champion Fritz Von Erich in Omaha, Nebraska. The Omaha version was abandoned after absorbed with the AWA World Heavyweight Championship.
 The AWA World Heavyweight Championship and the WCWA World Heavyweight Championship were unified to create the USWA Unified World Heavyweight Championship at SuperClash III, when the AWA World Heavyweight Champion Jerry "The King" Lawler defeated the WCCW World Heavyweight Champion Kerry Von Erich. The WCCW World Heavyweight Championship was quickly abandoned, and later the American Wrestling Association stripped the AWA World Heavyweight Championship from Jerry Lawler.
 The J-Crown, a combination of eight lightweight championships from various wrestling promotions, was defended mostly in Japan and Mexico. The title has since been abandoned and all championship belts returned to their home promotions.
 The WCW International World Heavyweight Championship was unified with the WCW World Heavyweight Championship when WCW World Heavyweight Champion Ric Flair defeated WCW International World Heavyweight Champion Sting at Clash of the Champions XXVII. The WCW International World Heavyweight Championship was immediately abandoned, though the physical championship belt was used as the WCW World Heavyweight Championship as it originally had in 1991.
 The ECW FTW Heavyweight Championship (an unrecognized title created by Tazz) was unified with the ECW World Heavyweight Championship on March 21, 1999, at Living Dangerously when ECW World Heavyweight Champion Taz defeated ECW FTW Heavyweight Champion Sabu. The FTW title was abandoned when Taz continued to defend the ECW World title. The FTW title, however, was reintroduced in the promotion All Elite Wrestling (AEW) in 2020.
 The WCW United States Championship was unified with the WWF Intercontinental Championship on November 18, 2001, at Survivor Series when United States Champion Edge defeated Intercontinental Champion Test. The United States title was abandoned, but was later revived as WWE's United States Championship in 2003 by Stephanie McMahon as a SmackDown!-exclusive title.
 The WCW Tag Team Championship was unified with the WWF Tag Team Championship at Survivor Series in 2001, when the WCW Tag Team Champions, The Dudley Boyz, defeated the WWF Tag Team Champions, The Hardy Boyz. The Dudleys won the WWF Tag Team Championship, and their WCW Tag Team Championship was absorbed into the WWF titles and abandoned. The titles had previously been held concurrently at SummerSlam (2001) when WCW Tag Team Champions The Brothers of Destruction defeated WWF Tag Team Champions Diamond Dallas Page and Chris Kanyon, although at that time both championship belts were held together instead of becoming one championship.

 The WCW Championship (rebranded as World Championship) and the WWF Championship were unified to create the Undisputed WWF Championship on December 9, 2001 at Vengeance when Chris Jericho defeated WWF Champion Stone Cold Steve Austin and World Champion The Rock in the same night. Essentially, the WWF Championship became the Undisputed Championship while the former WCW Championship was retired, although the championship belts used to represent the two championships would adorn the Undisputed WWF Champion for several months afterwards, up until a single championship belt was introduced to Triple H in April 2002. After the World Wrestling Federation (WWF) was renamed to World Wrestling Entertainment (WWE) and after the introduction of the brand split, where the promotion divided its roster into two brands where wrestlers exclusively performed, the championship was renamed as the WWE Championship in September 2002 when it became exclusive to the SmackDown! brand, resulting in the Raw brand introducing their own World Heavyweight Championship as a counterpart.
 The WWE European Championship was unified with the WWE Intercontinental Championship in July 2002, when Intercontinental Champion Rob Van Dam defeated European Champion Jeff Hardy on Raw in a title unification match. The European title was then abandoned.
 The WWE Hardcore Championship was unified with the WWE Intercontinental Championship in August 2002, when Intercontinental Champion Rob Van Dam pinned Hardcore Champion Tommy Dreamer. The Hardcore Championship was then abandoned.
 The WWE Intercontinental Championship was unified with the World Heavyweight Championship at No Mercy when World Heavyweight Champion Triple H defeated Intercontinental Champion Kane. The Intercontinental Championship was immediately abandoned, but was later revived in May 2003 by Raw Co-General Manager Stone Cold Steve Austin.
 The WWA World Heavyweight Championship was unified with the NWA World Heavyweight Championship when NWA World Heavyweight Champion Jeff Jarrett defeated WWA World Heavyweight Champion Sting on May 25, 2003 in Auckland, New Zealand in an inter-promotional match.
 The ROH Pure Championship was unified with the ROH World Championship when World Champion Bryan Danielson defeated Pure Champion Nigel McGuinness in Liverpool, England, on August 12, 2006, in a match contested under pure wrestling rules with the stipulation that both championships could be lost by disqualification or countout. The Pure Championship was later revived in 2020.
 The International Wrestling Association unified the IWA World Heavyweight Championship with the WWC Universal Heavyweight Championship when the World Wrestling Council's champion abandoned the company and participated in a unification match which was recognized by the National Wrestling Alliance, in the process creating the first Undisputed World Heavyweight Champion in Puerto Rico.
 The Inoki Genome Federation version of the IWGP Heavyweight Championship was unified with the New Japan Pro-Wrestling's version of the IWGP Heavyweight Championship when NJPW's IWGP Heavyweight Champion Shinsuke Nakamura defeated IGF's IWGP Heavyweight Champion Kurt Angle in Tokyo on February 17, 2008. The titles were unified due to a working agreement between Total Nonstop Action Wrestling (TNA) and New Japan Pro Wrestling in which Angle wrestled for TNA.
 The World Tag Team Championship was unified with the WWE Tag Team Championship in a dark match before WrestleMania XXV, when WWE Tag Team Champions The Colóns (Carlito and Primo) defeated World Tag Team Champions John Morrison and The Miz in Houston, Texas, on April 5, 2009 to become the "Unified WWE Tag Team Champions". Both titles, however, would remain independently active but defended together until the World Tag Team Championship was formally decommissioned in August 2010 in favor of continuing the WWE Tag Team Championship, which dropped the "unified" moniker.
 The original WWE Women's Championship was unified with the WWE Divas Championship at the Night of Champions pay-per-view in September 2010. Divas Champion Melina faced self-professed co-WWE Women's Champion Michelle McCool in a lumberjill match. McCool won the match due to interference from real Women's Champion Layla to unify the two titles. Following the win, the Women's Championship was retired after 54 years and the Divas Championship became briefly known as the "Unified WWE Divas Championship".

 The World Heavyweight Championship and WWE Championship were unified as the WWE World Heavyweight Championship at TLC: Tables, Ladders & Chairs in December 2013—two years after the end of the first brand split. WWE Champion Randy Orton defeated World Heavyweight Champion John Cena in a Tables, Ladders, and Chairs match to unify both championships and become the new WWE World Heavyweight Champion. The WWE Championship retained the lineage and the World Heavyweight Championship was retired, although the championship belts used to represent the two championships would adorn the WWE World Heavyweight Champion for several months afterwards, up until a single championship belt was introduced to Brock Lesnar in August 2014 on the Raw after SummerSlam. The WWE World Heavyweight Championship reverted to being called the WWE Championship in mid-2016 after the promotion reintroduced the brand split and the title became exclusive to SmackDown, resulting in Raw establishing the WWE Universal Championship as a counterpart.
 The GFW Global Championship was unified with the Impact Wrestling World Heavyweight Championship (former TNA World Heavyweight Championship) to create the Unified GFW World Heavyweight Championship at Slammiversary XV in July 2017. GFW Global Champion Alberto El Patron defeated Impact Wrestling World Heavyweight Champion Lashley to unify both championships and become the Unified World Heavyweight Champion. The new championship retained the lineage of the TNA/Impact Wrestling World Heavyweight Championship and the GFW Global Championship was retired, although the championship belts used to represent the two championships would adorn the Unified GFW World Heavyweight Champion until a single belt was eventually produced, and the championship was eventually renamed to Impact World Championship in 2018.
 The GFW Women's Championship was unified with the Impact Wrestling Knockouts Championship (former TNA Knockouts Championship) to create the Unified GFW Knockouts Championship at Slammiversary XV in July 2017. GFW Women's Champion Sienna defeated Impact Wrestling Knockouts Champion Rosemary to unify both championships. The new championship retained the lineage of the TNA/Impact Wrestling Knockouts Championship and the GFW Women's Championship was retired.
 The IWGP Heavyweight Championship and IWGP Intercontinental Championship were unified on March 1, 2021, to create the IWGP World Heavyweight Championship, a new championship that does not retain the lineage of either former title. At Wrestle Kingdom 14 in January 2020, both titles were won in a Double Gold Dash match. They remained independently active but were defended together over the next year. Kota Ibushi then won both championships at Wrestle Kingdom 15 in January 2021. While Ibushi was initially recognized as the unified champion on March 1, he requested an official title unification match to be held on March 4 at New Japan Pro-Wrestling's 49th Anniversary Show, where Ibushi defeated El Desperado to officially become the inaugural IWGP World Heavyweight Champion.
 The TNA World Heavyweight Championship and Impact World Championship were unified as the Impact Unified World Championship at Sacrifice on March 13, 2021. The Impact World Championship was originally known as the TNA World Heavyweight Championship before the company was renamed from Total Nonstop Action Wrestling (TNA) to Impact Wrestling in 2017. As part of a storyline in April 2020, Moose began to refer to himself as the TNA World Heavyweight Champion and carried the belt that last represented the title before it became known as the Impact World Championship. Impact did not recognize this until February 2021 and officially sanctioned Moose's championship. At Sacrifice, Impact World Champion Rich Swann defeated TNA World Heavyweight Champion Moose to unify the titles. The TNA World Heavyweight Championship was deactivated while the Impact World Championship became briefly known as the Impact Unified World Championship but reverted to Impact World Championship. The unified championship was represented by both title belts until August, when the TNA belt was retired.
 The NXT Cruiserweight Championship was unified with the NXT North American Championship at the special New Year's Evil episode of WWE NXT 2.0 on January 4, 2022. North American Champion Carmelo Hayes defeated Cruiserweight Champion Roderick Strong to unify the titles. The Cruiserweight Championship was then abandoned.
 The WWE Championship and Universal Championship were unified as the Undisputed WWE Universal Championship at WrestleMania 38 Night 2 on April 3, 2022. Universal Champion Roman Reigns defeated WWE Champion Brock Lesnar in a Winner Takes All match to unify the titles and become the Undisputed WWE Universal Champion. Even though the match was billed as a unification match, both championships are still independently active although the championship belts used to represent the two championships would adorn the Undisputed WWE Universal Champion much like the Undisputed WWF Championship (2001–2002) and the WWE World Heavyweight Championship (2013–2014).
 The Raw Tag Team Championship and SmackDown Tag Team Championship were unified as the Undisputed WWE Tag Team Championship on the May 20, 2022, episode of WWE SmackDown. SmackDown Tag Team Champions The Usos (Jey Uso and Jimmy Uso) defeated Raw Tag Team Champions RK-Bro (Randy Orton and Riddle) in a Winner Takes All match to unify the titles and become the Undisputed WWE Tag Team Champions. Even though the match was billed as a unification match, both championships are still independently active although the championship belts used to represent the two championships would adorn the Undisputed WWE Tag Team Champions much like the Unified WWE Tag Team Championship (2009–2010).
 The NXT United Kingdom Championship was unified with the NXT Championship at Worlds Collide on September 4, 2022. NXT Champion Bron Breakker defeated NXT United Kingdom Champion Tyler Bate to unify the titles and become the Unified NXT Champion. The NXT United Kingdom Championship was then abandoned.
 The NXT UK Women's Championship was unified with the NXT Women's Championship at Worlds Collide on September 4, 2022. NXT Women's Champion Mandy Rose defeated NXT UK Women's Champion Meiko Satomura and Blair Davenport in a triple threat match to unify the titles and become the Unified NXT Women's Champion. The NXT UK Women's Championship was then abandoned.
 The NXT UK Tag Team Championship was unified with the NXT Tag Team Championship at Worlds Collide on September 4, 2022. Pretty Deadly (Elton Prince and Kit Wilson) defeated NXT Tag Team Champions Creed Brothers (Brutus Creed and Julius Creed), NXT UK Tag Team Champions Brooks Jensen and Josh Briggs, and Gallus (Mark Coffey and Wolfgang) in a fatal four-way tag team elimination match to unify the titles and become the Unified NXT Tag Team Champions. The NXT UK Tag Team Championship was then abandoned.

See also
 List of early world heavyweight champions in professional wrestling
 Undisputed championship

References 

Professional wrestling championships
Professional wrestling slang